Dianne Hesselbein (born March 10, 1971) is an American Democratic politician from Madison, Wisconsin. She is a member of the Wisconsin State Senate, representing the 27th Senate district since January 2023.  She previously served ten years in the Wisconsin State Assembly, representing the 79th Assembly district from 2013 through 2022.

Biography

From Middleton, Wisconsin, Hesselbein graduated from La Follette High School in Madison, Wisconsin. Hesselbein then graduated from the University of Wisconsin–Oshkosh and received her masters from Edgewood College. Hesselbein served in the Dane County Board of Supervisors, representing her hometown of Middleton. In November 2012, Hesselbein was elected unopposed to the Wisconsin State Assembly as a Democrat.

References

County supervisors in Wisconsin
Edgewood College alumni
Living people
Politicians from Madison, Wisconsin
University of Wisconsin–Oshkosh alumni
Women state legislators in Wisconsin
1971 births
21st-century American politicians
21st-century American women politicians
People from Middleton, Wisconsin
Democratic Party members of the Wisconsin State Assembly
Democratic Party Wisconsin state senators